Danilo Caro Guarnieri (born 6 September 1965 in Bogotá) is a Colombian trap shooter. He competed in the trap event at the 2012 Summer Olympics and placed 29th in the qualification round. He won gold in Pan-American Games in 1999, bronze in 2003, and silver in 2011 where he received the quota for the London 2012 Olympic Games.

Olympic results

References

1965 births
Living people
Colombian male sport shooters
Olympic shooters of Colombia
Shooters at the 1996 Summer Olympics
Shooters at the 2000 Summer Olympics
Shooters at the 2004 Summer Olympics
Shooters at the 2012 Summer Olympics
Shooters at the 2016 Summer Olympics
Sportspeople from Bogotá
Shooters at the 2015 Pan American Games
Shooters at the 1999 Pan American Games
Pan American Games medalists in shooting
Pan American Games silver medalists for Colombia
South American Games gold medalists for Colombia
South American Games bronze medalists for Colombia
South American Games medalists in shooting
Competitors at the 2014 South American Games
Medalists at the 1999 Pan American Games
Medalists at the 2015 Pan American Games
21st-century Colombian people